WBZV (102.5 FM, "Buzz 102.5") is a radio station broadcasting a classic rock format. Licensed to Hudson, Michigan, it first began broadcasting in 1995 under the WMXE call sign. Unlike its sister stations WABJ and WQTE in Adrian, Michigan, WBZV primarily targets the Hillsdale area.

The 102.5 frequency has used satellite-delivered formats from ABC Radio/SMN throughout its existence. When the station signed on as WMXE "Mix 102.5," it used the adult contemporary format known as "StarStation" (now "Hits & Favorites"), and later switched to the Hot AC format known as "Today's Best Hits". Today, "Buzz 102.5" uses Westwood One's Classic Rock feed.

On December 23,2022 it was announced by radioinsight.com that WBZV will be sold to The Educational Media Foundation and become an affiliate of The K-love Network.

References

https://radioinsight.com/headlines/246443/station-sales-week-of-12-23/

External links

BZV-FM
Classic rock radio stations in the United States
Radio stations established in 1995